Albina Borisovna Dzhanabaeva (born April 9, 1979, in Volgograd, Russia) is a Russian singer, actress, TV-Host. Best known for being a member in the Ukrainian girl group VIA Gra from 2004 to 2013.

Biography 

She completed music school majoring in piano and also in the department of musical theatre at the Gnesynikh Institute.

Then, in 1999 she traveled to Korea to take part in Snow White and the Seven Dwarves where she sang the part of the foreign Snow White in Korean.

In 2002, she returned to Russia to join singer Valeriy Meladze as a backing vocalist, where she stayed for two years.

In the autumn of 2004, she joined Ukrainian girl group VIA Gra following Valeriy’s recommendation.

In 2012 she starred in the film Betrayal. The film was selected to compete for the Golden Lion at the 69th Venice International Film Festival.

VIA Gra had split 1 January 2013 and started her solo career and has enjoyed success in both Russia and Ukraine.

Personal life 
She currently lives in Moscow, bringing up her sons Konstantin and Luka

Singles 
 2013: Kapli (Drops)
 2013: Nadoyeli (Fed up)

Filmography 
 2012: Betrayal

References

External links
Fan site
Albina Dzhanabeva on Nu Virgos website

1979 births
Living people
Actors from Volgograd
Nu Virgos members
21st-century Russian women singers
21st-century Russian singers
Musicians from Volgograd
Mass media people from Volgograd